A torus, pl. tori, is a type of surface.

Torus may also refer to:

Music 

Torus (album), a 2013 album by Sub Focus
Torus, a 2017 EP by Merzbow (Masami Akita)

Science and technology

Architecture 

 A semicircular molding – see Molding (decorative)#Types

Astrophysics 

Three-torus model of the universe, a model for describing the shape of the universe

Biology 

 Receptacle (botany), the thickened part of a stem from which the flower and fruit parts grow
 Sagittal keel, or sagittal torus, a structure found in crania
 Torus, a structure of the xylem

Mathematics 

 Torus knot
 Algebraic torus
 Umbilic torus
 Genus-2 surface, also called "double torus"
 Maximal torus
 Clifford torus

Medicine 

 Torus palatinus, a bony growth on the palate
 Torus mandibularis, a bony growth on the mandible
 Torus tubarius, the base of the opening of Eustachian tube into the nasopharynx
 Torus fracture, a term used in radiology to describe an incomplete fracture of the distal radius in children where there is no obvious fracture line on any radiograph.

Nuclear physics 

 Torus (nuclear physics), a subtype of tokamak
 Joint European Torus, an experimental nuclear fusion reactor

Other uses 

 Torus (housing association)

See also 
 Toroidal (disambiguation)
 Tokamak